Crotaphytus is a genus of lizards commonly known as collared lizards.  They are a genus of small to medium-sized predators indigenous to the American southwest, Baja peninsula, and Mexico. They can be as small as 8" or as long as 14″ (20-36cm), and are characterized by distinct bands of black or brown around their neck, thus their common name.

Species and subspecies

The following species and subspecies are recognized as being valid.
Crotaphytus antiquus  – venerable collared lizard
Crotaphytus bicinctores  – Great Basin collared lizard or desert collared lizard 
Crotaphytus collaris  – common collared lizard
Crotaphytus collaris auriceps  – yellow-headed collared lizard
Crotaphytus collaris baileyi  – western collared lizard
Crotaphytus collaris collaris  – eastern collared lizard
Crotaphytus collaris fuscus  – Chihuahuan collared lizard
Crotaphytus collaris melanomaculatus  – black-spotted collared lizard
Crotaphytus dickersonae  – Sonoran collared lizard
Crotaphytus grismeri  – Grismer's collared lizard
Crotaphytus insularis  – eastern collared lizard
Crotaphytus nebrius  – Sonoran collared lizard 
Crotaphytus reticulatus  – reticulated collared lizard 
Crotaphytus vestigium  – Baja California collared lizard

Nota bene: A binomial authority in parentheses or a trinomial authority in parentheses indicates that the species or subspecies was originally described in a genus other than Crotaphytus.

Symbol

In 1969, Oklahoma designated its first state reptile when it chose the collared lizard.

References

Citations

Bibliography

Holbrook JE (1842). North American Herpetology; or, A Description of the Reptiles Inhabiting the United States. Vol. II. (Second edition). Philadelphia: J. Dobson. 142 pp. (Crotaphytus, new genus, p. 79).

External links 
  Photos of genus members

Crotaphytus
Lizard genera
Taxa named by John Edwards Holbrook